Marius Nae (born 9 February 1981 in Bucharest) is a retired Romanian professional association football player.

References
 
 

1981 births
Living people
Romanian footballers
FCV Farul Constanța players
FC Progresul București players
FC Sportul Studențesc București players
ASC Daco-Getica București players
Association football midfielders
Footballers from Bucharest
Liga I players
Liga II players